Middle Park is a residential south-western suburb in the Centenary Suburbs in the City of Brisbane, Queensland, Australia.

Geography

Middle Park is bounded to the north by the McLeod Country Golf Club, to the West by Baronga Street and Horizon Drive, Lalina Street and Macfarlane Street, to the south by Sumners Road and to the east by Estate Road and Beanland Street.

All but 73 of the houses in Middle Park are stand-alone, with townhouses accounting for most of the remainder.  Townhouses are commonly two-storey buildings on a small plot of land in a gated community.

The typical Middle Park house is 220 m2 in area on a block of land of 600 m2.  It has a large open-plan living area, four bedrooms, two bathrooms (one ensuite) and a double garage.  It is single-storey "brick and tile", built on a concrete slab, with a brick outer skin and plasterboard inner skin on wooden framing, and a tile roof on wooden framing.  It has a pool in the back yard.

History 
The suburb was named by Queensland Place Names Board on 8 January 1973. It was the one of the six "Centenary Suburbs" developed by L.J. Hooker Real Estate . It was released for development in July 1976, the last of the 6 suburbs to be developed.

The western part of the original land holdings that became the Centenary Suburbs were part of the Wolston Estate, consisting of 54 farms on an area of 3000 acres, offered for auction at Centennial Hall, Brisbane, on 16 October 1901. Wolston Estate is the property of M. B. Goggs, whose father obtained the land forty years previously in the 1860s and after whom Goggs Road is named. Only three of the farms sold at the original auction.

Most housing was constructed between 1980 and 1990.

St Catherine's Anglican Church was dedicated in 1980.

Good News Lutheran Primary School opened on 31 January 1984.

Middle Park State School opened on 27 January 1987.

In 2001, 78% of homes were owner-occupied, 19% were rented.

The median house price during 2009 was AU$525,500, and the median weekly rent paid for a three-bedroom house in the December 2005 quarter was AU$460.

The median age of the Middle Park population was 38 years of age, 1 year above the Australian median.  61.2% of people living in Middle Park were born in Australia, compared to the national average of 69.8%; the next most common countries of birth were England 5.6%, New Zealand 3.7%, Vietnam 2.6%, China 2.3%, Sri Lanka 1.8%.  72.5% of people spoke only English at home; the next most common languages were 3.7% Cantonese, 3.7% Vietnamese, 3.4% Mandarin, 2% Tamil, 0.9% Hindi.

Representation
The people of Middle Park are represented by government at three levels. In the House of Representatives of the Parliament of Australia by Milton Dick, the Australian Labor Party Member for the electorate of Oxley.  In the Queensland Parliament by Jessica Pugh, the Australian Labor Party Member for Mount Ommaney.  On Brisbane City Council by Councillor Matthew Bourke, the Liberal National Party Member for the Jamboree Ward.

Education 
Middle Park State School is a government primary (Prep-6) school for boys and girls at Cnr Sumners Road & Macfarlane Street. In 2017, the school had an enrolment of 646 students with 50 teachers (42 full-time equivalent) and 26 non-teaching staff (16 full-time equivalent). It includes a special education program. The School's motto is "Each to Succeed".

Good News Lutheran School is a private primary (Prep-6) school for boys and girls at 49 Horizon Drive. In 2017, the school had an enrolment of 352 students with 26 teachers (24 full-time equivalent) and 21 non-teaching staff (14 full-time equivalent).

Amenities 
Park Village Shopping Centre (also known as Metro Middle Park) is located on the corner of Horizon Drive and Riverhills Road. It has a Coles supermarket and 25 speciality shops.

Centenary Baptist Church is at 8 Riverhills Road.

Centenary Uniting Church is at 37 Riverhills Road.

Good News Lutheran Church is at 49 Horizon Drive.

St Catherine's Anglican Community is at 43 MacFarlane Street.

The Salvation Army Centenary Corps is on the corner of MacFarlane Street and Lalina Street.

References

External links

 

Suburbs of the City of Brisbane
1970 establishments in Australia
Populated places established in 1970